was a senior officer in the Imperial Japanese Army during World War II. He was the Commandant of Cadets at the Komamoto Army Training School between 1934 and 1936, before being posted as the Commanding Officer Noncommissioned Officer Candidates Kwantung Army. He was the Commanding Officer of the 20th Depot Division when war broke out and was the Commanding Officer of the 41st Division in New Guinea in 1942. He died of illness, presumed to be Dracunculiasis at Wewak in September 1943.

Military career

Ranks Promotions

References

 http://forum.valka.cz/viewtopic.php/title/Abe-Heisuke/t/146715
 http://www45160u.sakura.ne.jp/DB/阿部平輔

1886 births
1943 deaths
Imperial Japanese Army generals of World War II
Infectious disease deaths in Papua New Guinea
Japanese military personnel killed in World War II
Members of the Kwantung Army